Perry Bridge, also known as the Zig Zag Bridge, is a bridge  over the River Tame in Perry Barr, Birmingham, England.  Built in 1711, it is a Grade II listed building and a Scheduled monument.

The bridge is constructed of red sandstone in a packhorse style. It is believed that it is the bridge built by order of the Staffordshire Quarter Sessions, held in 1709, to take the place of a 'wood horse bridge' (Perry Barr was in Staffordshire until 1928). It is said to have been built by Sir Henry Gough of nearby Perry Hall. A crossing has been on the spot since Roman times as this was the exact spot where Ryknild Street (today's Aldridge Road) crossed the river, giving rise to the local placename, "Holford". A stream, "Holbrook", joins the river adjacent to the bridge.

Written evidence of this crossing date back to as early as 1509 when there was mention of a field, named "Bridge Meadow", being located nearby.

It is now open only to pedestrian traffic. It appears in the badge of Handsworth Grammar School.

A replacement bridge, in Art Deco style, built in 1932, stands alongside, and carries vehicular traffic on the route.

References

British History Online: 1890 Ordnance Survey 1:2,500: Epoch 1

Grade II listed buildings in Birmingham
Transport in Birmingham, West Midlands
Bridges in the West Midlands (county)
Scheduled monuments in the West Midlands (county)
Stone bridges in the United Kingdom
Bridges completed in 1711
Bridges completed in 1932
Road bridges in England
Perry Barr
1711 establishments in England
Stone arch bridges
Grade II listed bridges